The Groupe scolaire Paul Gauguin or the Lycée Français Paul Gauguin was a French international school in Agadir, Morocco.

In 2013 an announcement stating that there is a possibility of the school merging with the Lycée Français d'Agadir (LFA) caused uprising amongst the parents. On 31 August 2014 the school closed, and students were moved to the LFA.

References

External links
 Groupe scolaire Paul Gauguin
 Union des Conseils de Parents d’Elèves du Maroc – Conseil des Parents d’Elèves Agadir. "Agadir : les enjeux réels de la fermeture du Lycée Paul Gauguin" (Archive). La Voix de France. Friday 24 January 2014.

2014 disestablishments in Morocco
Educational institutions disestablished in 2014
Agadir
French international schools in Morocco